Events in the year 1832 in Brazil.

Incumbents
Monarch – Pedro II

Events

Births
 20 July - Henrique Dumont
 31 December - Junqueira Freire

Deaths

References

 
1830s in Brazil
Years of the 19th century in Brazil
Brazil
Brazil